WSOU (89.5 FM) is a non-commercial, college radio station. The station broadcasts from the campus of Seton Hall University in South Orange, New Jersey. It is a student-run station with university administrator Mark Maben serving as its current General Manager. The station also streams online.

Programming
The station currently broadcasts a modern active rock format, featuring heavy metal, punk, emo, hardcore and post-hardcore as well as other types of rock-based music. Student disc jockeys play music from this regular rotation during the vast majority of the week – with the exception of specialty shows and community programming (see below).

Managers
The station's general manager is Mark Maben, who has worked there since 2004. The elected student management board for 2022-2023 is as follows: Station Manager Kayla Fonseca, Program Director Joey Nardone, Music Director Patrick Ritter, News Director John Makuch, Promotions Director Kristin Acheson, Sports Director Joe Matthews, Technical Operations Director Joe Walls, and Social Media Director Mary Ortel

Specialty shows
WSOU broadcasts nightly "specialty shows", most of which are devoted entirely to a specific genre of music.

WSOU also offers a diverse lineup of syndicated shows, including several programs from the U.S. Conference of Catholic Bishops. The list includes Christopher Closeup and Voices of Our World.

Sports programming
WSOU is also the leader in coverage of Seton Hall athletics. The sports department at WSOU broadcasts all home and away games for both men's and women's basketball, the school's flagship sports. Also aired throughout the year are select games for men's and women's soccer and baseball.

Online listening at WSOU.net increases significantly when men's basketball games are broadcast. Following each men's basketball game is Hall Line, a post game call-in show that allows Pirate fans the chance to share their thoughts about the game and/or the team. The show, which is hosted by student on-air talent, either in-studio or at the site of the game, has been on the air since the 1960s. It currently is the longest-running sports program at WSOU.

Along with Hall Line, WSOU also offers two Sunday evening sports talk shows hosted by students, From the Stands (pro sports talk) and Pirate Primetime (Seton Hall athletics talk).

Sports alumni

In its 60th year of broadcasting, WSOU has had many notable alumni start their sports broadcasting careers while students at Seton Hall University and members of the radio station. Several of these alumni are well known throughout sports, including Bob Ley (ESPN), Bob Picozzi (ESPN), Jim Hunter (Baltimore Orioles broadcaster), Matt Loughlin (New Jersey Devils radio play-by-play announcer) and Ed Lucas (Emmy Winning blind Yankee Broadcaster, YES Network.)

WSOU HD2

On July 1, 2009, WSOU launched WSOU HD2, a 24/7 Catholic programming channel.

Seton Hall University first made the decision to invest in HD radio technology for WSOU, as to keep it on the cutting edge of broadcast technology. As HD radio technology allows broadcasting on multiple channels, the university chose to reflect its commitment to the Catholic mission through this additional channel. WSOU Chief Engineer Frank Scafidi and Jim Malespina, chair of the WSOU Advisory Board, program the channel on a weekly basis. It operates out of the WSOU studios.

Programming highlights include:

 Daily Mass at 8 a.m. from Seton Hall's Chapel of the Immaculate Conception
 Mornings with Mother, an EWTN program with Mother Angelica
 Women of Grace
 EWTN Spanish programming during the overnight hours
 Catholic Answers Live
 Blocks of Christian rock and classical music in primetime

The station also broadcasts some of the WSOU-FM weekend community programs, including the Celtic Heritage Hour and the Kinship of Catholics and Jews.

History
WSOU began broadcasting on 89.5 FM on April 14, 1948, under the direction of Monsignor Thomas J. Gillhooly, the station's first faculty director. It was the first college-owned FM station in New Jersey and one of the first FM stations in the United States.
 
Given the assignment by then-Seton Hall University president Monsignor James Kelly to create a radio station, Monsignor Gillhooly got WSOU up and running in just three months and provided a steady hand during the station's early days. Assisting Monsignor Gillhooly in building WSOU was the station's longtime chief engineer Tom Parnham, who helped construct the station and then remained with WSOU. Parnham worked at WSOU from 1948 until his death in 1994.

WSOU began taking the shape of its current format in 1969, the first year it began to air rock and roll music. It embraced a hard rock and metal format starting on September 4, 1986.
Other station milestones include the move to stereo technology in the 1970s, the start of online streaming in the mid-1990s (among the first NJ stations to do so), and the move to digital HD radio technology in 2008.

In the 2000s, WSOU underwent amendments to its music format. At the request of university officials citing the Catholic mission of Seton Hall, certain bands were eliminated from regular rotation, while others were relegated to overnight airplay only. The most notable band that was eliminated from rotation was heavy metal act Slayer.

It is estimated that over 120,000 people listen to the station each week. Its 2,400-watt signal from the Seton Hall campus reaches all five boroughs of New York City and much of northern and central New Jersey.

WSOU's studios were originally located first floor of the university's recreation center, part of its South Orange campus. In 1998, the station was moved to a state-of-the-art facility inside a new addition to the recreation center.

It operates there to this day, complete with three recording studios, a newsroom, the main on-air studio, the James Malespina Master Control Room, offices for student and station management, a classroom and the Dino and Diane Tortu Student Lounge.

Due to a sponsorship arrangement, WSOU has renamed their studios the Meadowlands Racetrack Studio, as heard during their Station Identification messages. The studio has not relocated to the Meadowlands.

In 2021 DJ Valentino Petrarca made history by being the first staff member to interview 100 artists. When he left WSOU in 2022 he had ended with 136 under his belt. 

WSOU has earned many honors and numerous awards over the years, including:

 Marconi Award for Best Non-Commercial Radio, 2016
 Peabody Award
 CMJ College Station of the Year (multiple times)
 Friday Morning Quarterback Metal Station of the Year (three consecutive times)
 Recipient of over 30 gold and platinum records, ranging from Iron Maiden to Linkin Park
 Rolling Stone rock magazine distinction as a “Top 5 radio stations in the country”

WSOU and Seton Hall University
WSOU has been a crucial part of the Seton Hall University community since its inception. In its current format, all of the station's DJs, newscasters, sportscasters and engineers are enrolled students at the university (with the exception of weekend community programmers, many of which are Seton Hall alumni).

Additionally, students are elected to one-year management terms to head the station – specifically the programming, music, promotions, news and sports departments. Through the students and the community programmers, the station stays live on the air 24/7, 365 days a year.

Since its inception, WSOU has always been a student-run radio station and, to this day, Seton Hall University owns the station's FM license.

Although a noncommercial station, WSOU's management and staff structure is modeled on commercial radio, which provides students with enriching career-oriented educational experiences. Opportunities for student staff members include on-air hosting (DJing), production, promotions, newscasting, sportscasting, programming, sales and marketing, and engineering. WSOU draws students from all university colleges and programs, including communications, business, biology, education, nursing, sports management and diplomacy.

The WSOU student staff also participate with many university events, such as the annual University Day homecoming weekend.

WSOU mission statement
The following Mission Statement concerning the nature of WSOU is taken from the WSOU-FM Task Force (August, 1988):

The Mission of WSOU-FM is:

To provide students with an educational experience in a co-curricular activity which is both pedagogically sound and professionally realistic;

To foster the image of Seton Hall University as a principled institution of higher education committed to teaching in the real world; and

To provide the university and the immediate community of northern New Jersey's metropolitan area with public service in broadcasting that meets the public's interests, convenience and needs.

Controversies

Since WSOU's inception, station management has frequently clashed with Seton Hall University's president and board of trustees over its heavy metal programming. Monsignor Robert Sheeran, who was at the time president of Seton Hall, felt it was inappropriate for a Roman Catholic educational and religious institution to air programming counter to the Roman Catholic belief. Sheeran and the university's board of trustees made veiled threats to shut the station down and sell the FCC license if programming was not more aligned to the Catholic faith. The university, realizing the large listener and community support, backed down and let the station's heavy metal programming continue. Catholic programming was later made available on WSOU's HD-2 sub-digital channel.

On June 1, 2006, Michael Collazo, a Seton Hall University professor and faculty advisor at WSOU, was arrested and charged with money laundering and embezzlement of over half a million dollars from illegal leasing of the station's subcarrier to EIES of New Jersey, an audio service for the blind and a Haitian radio service starting in 1991 until he was fired by Seton Hall University in 2004 after the university conducted an audit of WSOU's finances. On July 12, 2006, Collazo pleaded guilty to embezzlement, with prosecutors seeking a five-year jail sentence.

In 2021, members of a group calling themselves "Shut Down WSOU" began protesting outside Seton Hall University, claiming WSOU to be "Satanic" and demanding that the station be shut down. In response, a Seton Hall University spokesperson stated that "WSOU's advisory board  WSOU students and alumni along with Seton Hall University clergy and administrators, meets regularly to review the station's content and operating policies and standards."

Notable alumni
For more than 70 years, WSOU has been mentoring and graduating students who go on successful careers in the news, broadcast, music and entertainment industries.  The following is a sampling of the many noteworthy station alumni

 Bernie Wagenblast, WINS, WABC traffic reporter, one of the voices of the New York City Subway
 Bob Ley, ESPN Sports Center anchor
 Bob Picozzi, ESPN Radio & TV, former sports anchor on ESPN's Mike & Mike National Radio Program
 Bob Wussler, former president, CBS Television Network; co-founder of CNN (deceased)
 Bryan DeNovellis, weekend sports anchor, News 12 New Jerseyze WWZY 107.1/99.7FM
 Donna Fiducia, former Fox News Channel anchor and NYC television personality
 Ed Lucas, Emmy-winning Yankee blind broadcaster, YES Network
 Jim Hunter, play-by-play announcer, Baltimore Orioles
 Joey Wahler, WFAN sports anchor
 John Kobylt, KFI talk show host
 Kim Mulligan, co-host, WDHA's Morning Jolt
 Mark St. Germain, playwright
 Matt Loughlin, New Jersey Devils radio play-by-play announcer
 Pete Tauriello, 1010 WINS/Metro Networks traffic reporter
 Robert Desiderio, actor

References

External links 
WSOU official website
Seton Hall University official website

WSOU archival collection

Seton Hall University
SOU
Radio stations established in 1948